Chaqu-ye Akhvani (also Romanized as Chāqū-ye Ākhvānī) is a village in Akhtarabad Rural District, in the Central District of Malard County, Tehran Province, Iran. At the 2006 census, its population was 195, in 50 families.

References 

Populated places in Malard County